Charles Grimes may refer to:

 Charles Grimes (surveyor) (1772–1858), English surveyor in colonial Australia
 Charles Grimes (rower) (1935–2007), American rower